El Sur (1990) is a TV movie written and directed by Carlos Saura and is a chapter in the Spanish TV series Los Cuentos de Borges.  Saura's 55-minute film is based on the short story El Sur by Argentine author Jorge Luis Borges.

Plot

A shy Argentine librarian Juan Dahlman (Oscar Martinez) dreams that he is fatally stabbed on his family's ranch, located in southern Argentina.  After suffering a head injury he is ordered to rest until he fully recovers.  Dahlman decides to spend his time recovering at his family's ranch, fulfilling his long-held desire to revisiting the ranch.  He sets off for the ranch and the destiny that awaits him there.

Cast

 Óscar Martínez as Juan Dahlmann
 Nini Gambier as Doña Rosario
 Alexandra Davel as Sara Dahlmann
 Gerardo Romano as Carlos Manchon
 Juan Leyrado as Sergio
 Arturo Bonin as Casiano
 Villanueva Cosse as Don Alejandro
 Jorge Marrale as Pastor Guillermo Brige

References

External links 
 The Internet Movie Database
 Carlos Saura's Official Page (In Spanish)

1992 films
Spanish drama films
1990s Spanish-language films
Films directed by Carlos Saura
Argentine drama films
1992 drama films
Films based on short fiction
1990s Argentine films
1990s Spanish films